Marcus Skokan (born 25 June 1977) is a former Austrian footballer who played as a defender.

References

1969 births
Living people
Austrian footballers
Floridsdorfer AC players
SKN St. Pölten players
SC Ostbahn XI players
Association football defenders
2. Liga (Austria) players